The 2010 Montepaschi Strade Bianche is a cycling race that took place on 6 March 2010. It was the 4th edition of the international classic Montepaschi Strade Bianche. The previous edition was won by Thomas Löfkvist, who rode for

Results

Strade Bianche
Montepaschi Strade Bianche
2010 in Italian sport